Tanwir Afzal (born 12 June 1988) is a Hong Kong cricketer. He played for Hong Kong in the 2014 ICC World Twenty20 tournament. He made his One Day International debut against Afghanistan in the 2014 ACC Premier League on 1 May 2014.

In May 2015 he was named as the captain of the Hong Kong squad for the 2015 ICC World Twenty20 Qualifier after James Atkinson resigned from the post.

In August 2018, he was named in Hong Kong's squad for the 2018 Asia Cup Qualifier tournament. Hong Kong won the qualifier tournament, and he was then named in Hong Kong's squad for the 2018 Asia Cup.

In December 2018, he was named in Hong Kong's team for the 2018 ACC Emerging Teams Asia Cup. In April 2019, he was named in Hong Kong's squad for the 2019 ICC World Cricket League Division Two tournament in Namibia. Previously, he has represented Pakistan at Under-19 level.

References

External links
 
 

1988 births
Living people
Hong Kong cricketers
Hong Kong cricket captains
Hong Kong One Day International cricketers
Hong Kong Twenty20 International cricketers
Cricketers from Gujrat
Pakistani emigrants to Hong Kong
Pakistani cricketers
Hong Kong people of Punjabi descent
Sportspeople of Pakistani descent